This is a list of notable animal sanctuaries from around the world. This list contains only sanctuaries who have their own articles within Wikipedia, or a section within an article in Wikipedia.

Argentina 
 Santuario Equidad, San Marcos Sierras, Córdoba Province

Australia
Warrawong Sanctuary, Adelaide

Bolivia
Parque Ambue Ari, Santa Cruz Department Run with help from volunteers by Comunidad Inti Wara Yassi.
Parque Jacj Cuisi, La Paz Department Run with help from volunteers by Comunidad Inti Wara Yassi.
Parque Machía, Villa Tunari  Run with help from volunteers by Comunidad Inti Wara Yassi.

Canada

 The Donkey Sanctuary of Canada, Guelph, Ontario
 Fauna Foundation, a chimpanzee sanctuary, Chambly, Quebec
 George C. Reifel Migratory Bird Sanctuary, Delta, British Columbia
 North Mountain Animal Sanctuary, Burlington, Nova Scotia. Sanctuary for abused, neglected, and unwanted farm animals.
 RAPS Cat Sanctuary, Richmond, British Columbia

Chile
Santuario Igualdad Interespecie, Santiago de Chile

Germany 

 Wohlfühlhof Zeh, Waltenhofen, Bavaria

India
See: Wildlife sanctuaries of India- For Example: 
 Bhadra Wildlife Sanctuary
 Bandhavgarh National Park
 Bandipur National Park
 Bhindawas Wildlife Sanctuary
 Chinnar Wildlife Sanctuary, Idukki district, Kerala state
 Dandeli Wildlife Sanctuary, Uttara Kannada District, Karnataka state 
 Dudhwa National Park, Lakhimpur Kheri District, Uttar Pradesh
 Gir National Park and Sasan Gir Sanctuary, Talala Gir, Gujarat
 The Great Himalayan National Park, Kullu region, Himachal Pradesh 
 Hemis National Park
 Jim Corbett National Park
 Kanha National Park
 Kaziranga National Park
 Keoladeo Ghana National Park
 Manas National Park
 Nagarhole National Park
 Panna National Park
 Pench National Park
 Periyar National Park
 Rajaji National Park
 Ranthambore National Park, Sawai Madhopur district, Rajasthan
 Sadhana Forest
 Sariska National Park
 Silent Valley National Park
 Sundarbans National Park
 Tadoba Andhari Tiger Reserve

Italy
 Italian Horse Protection Association (IHP), Montaione

Kenya

 African Fund for Endangered Wildlife Kenya limited (AFEW (K) LTD) also known as the Giraffe Centre
 Amboseli Trust for Elephants
 David Sheldrick Wildlife Trust
 Ol Pejeta Conservancy
 Tsavo East National Park
 Tsavo West National Park

Malaysia
 Kota Kinabalu Wetland Centre, Kota Kinabalu

New Zealand

 Maungatautari Restoration Project
 Orokonui Ecosanctuary
 Pukaha / Mount Bruce National Wildlife Centre
 Shakespear Open Sanctuary
 Bird Sanctuary
 Willowbank Wildlife Reserve
 Zealandia

Pakistan
 Ayubia National Park
 Deosai National Park
 Haleji Lake
 Hingol National Park
 Kirthar National Park
 Khunjerab National Park
 Lal Suhanra National Park
 Machiara National Park
 Margalla Hills National Park
 Rann of Kutch Wildlife Sanctuary

Senegal
 Djoudj National Bird Sanctuary, near Saint-Louis

South Africa
 Kruger National Park

Switzerland

Tanzania
 Serengeti National Park

Thailand
 Elephant Nature Park, Chiang Mai Province

United Arab Emirates
 Sir Bani Yas
 Ras Al Khor

Uganda

United Kingdom

England
 Buttercups Sanctuary for Goats in Maidstone, Kent.
 Cornish Seal Sanctuary, Gweek, Cornwall
 Ferne Animal Sanctuary, Somerset, Wambrook, near Chard, originally run by Nina Douglas-Hamilton, Duchess of Hamilton
 Hillside Animal Sanctuary, Frettenham, Norwich
 Lower Moss Wood Educational Nature Reserve and Wildlife Hospital, Knutsford, Cheshire
 Monkey World, Wool, Dorset
 Mousehole Wild Bird Hospital and Sanctuary, Mousehole, Cornwall
 Natureland Seal Sanctuary, Skegness
 Raystede animal rescue and sanctuary, Lewes, East Sussex
 Redwings Horse Sanctuary, Norwich, Norfolk
 Swan Sanctuary, Shepperton
 The Horse Trust, Speen, Buckinghamshire
 The Monkey Sanctuary, Looe, Cornwall
 Thornberry Animal Sanctuary, Rotherham, South Yorkshire
The Donkey Sanctuary, Sidmouth, Devon

Northern Ireland
 Assisi Animal Sanctuary, Conlig, Northern Ireland

Scotland
 Willows Animal Sanctuary, Fraserburgh, Scotland

Wales
 Wales Ape and Monkey Sanctuary, Abercrave, Wales

United States

California
 Animal Place, Grass Valley
 Farm Sanctuary, with locations in Acton (Animal Acres) and Orland
 The Gentle Barn, Santa Clarita

Colorado
 Mission: Wolf, Westcliffe
 The Wild Animal Sanctuary, Keenesburg

Florida
 Big Cat Rescue, Tampa
Forest Animal Rescue by Peace River Refuge & Ranch, Silver Springs
 Save the Chimps, Fort Pierce
Critter Creek Farm Sanctuary, Gainesville

Indiana
 Black Pine Animal Sanctuary, Albion

Louisiana
 Chimp Haven, Keithville

Missouri 

 The Gentle Barn, Dittmer

Montana
 Yellowstone Wildlife Sanctuary, Red Lodge, Montana

New Jersey
 Popcorn Park Zoo, Lacey
 The Raptor Trust, Millington

New York
 Farm Sanctuary, Watkins Glen
 Woodstock Farm Animal Sanctuary, High Falls

North Carolina
 Carolina Tiger Rescue, Pittsboro
 Goathouse Refuge, Pittsboro

Oregon
 Chimps Inc., Bend

Rhode Island
 Norman Bird Sanctuary, Middletown

Tennessee
 The Elephant Sanctuary, Hohenwald
 The Gentle Barn, Christiana
 Tiger Haven, Roane County
 Old Friends Senior Dog Sanctuary, Mount Juliet, Tennessee

Texas
 Bat World Sanctuary, Palo Pinto County
 Primarily Primates, Bexar County

Utah
 Best Friends Animal Society, Angel Canyon, near Kanab

Zimbabwe
 Hwange National Park

References 

Animal rights
Animal rights-related lists